Diphenylhexatriene is a fluorescent hydrocarbon used in the study of cell membranes.  It is almost non-fluorescent in water, but it exhibits strong fluorescence when it is intercalated into lipid membranes. It incorporates itself into the lipid bilayer and acts like a lipid.

References

External links
 1,6-Diphenylhexatriene, Oregon Medical Laser Center

Polyenes
Fluorescent dyes
Phenyl compounds